A total lunar eclipse took place on Monday, May 13, 1957, the third of fourteen total lunar eclipses of Lunar Saros 130. The Moon was plunged into darkness for 1 hour and 18 minutes, in a deep total eclipse which saw the Moon 30% of its diameter inside the Earth's umbral shadow. The visual effect of this depends on the state of the Earth's atmosphere, but the Moon may have been stained a deep red colour. The partial eclipse lasted for 3 hours and 32 minutes in total.

Visibility

Related lunar eclipses

Lunar year series

Saros series

Half-Saros cycle
A lunar eclipse will be preceded and followed by solar eclipses by 9 years and 5.5 days (a half saros). This lunar eclipse is related to two annular solar eclipses of Solar Saros 137.

See also
List of lunar eclipses
List of 20th-century lunar eclipses

Notes

External links

1957-05
1957 in science
May 1957 events